Kirsten Engel is an American lawyer and politician who has served as a member of the Arizona House of Representatives and the Arizona Senate. Engel was the Democratic nominee in 2022 for Arizona's 6th congressional district, losing narrowly to Republican Juan Ciscomani.

Early life and education
Engel was born and raised in Chicago. She graduated magna cum laude from Brown University in 1983 and Northwestern University School of Law in 1986.

Career 
After law school, Engel clerked for Judge Myron H. Bright of the United States Court of Appeals for the Eighth Circuit. Engel worked for the United States Environmental Protection Agency, then for Earthjustice under its former name. She was an assistant attorney general in the Massachusetts Attorney General's Office until 2005.

Engel was elected to the Arizona House of Representatives in 2016 and assumed office in January 2017. Engel did not seek re-election to the House in 2020 and was instead a candidate for the Arizona Senate. She assumed office in January 2021, serving until her resignation on September 8, 2021, to run for Congress.

Environment
In her 2022 campaign, Engel identified climate change as her foremost priority. Engel's 2022 campaign emphasized her support for increasing the capture of solar energy in Arizona. Engel expressed support for strengthening federal measures to limit air and water pollution from power stations.

Education
Engel supports increasing funding for public schools and has said that observing conditions at her daughter's public school motivated her to run for office initially.

Immigration
Engel characterized the situation at the U.S.-Mexico border as "a humanitarian crisis" and expressed support for reforming asylum-seeking processes.

Policing/Mental Health
Engel has stated she supports "some screening so that the appropriate personnel respond to the crises that right now the police are forced to respond to."

Personal life
Engel and her husband Scott have one daughter and live in Tucson, Arizona.

References

External links

 Kirsten Engel for Arizona campaign website
 Biography at Ballotpedia
 Biography at the University of Arizona

21st-century American politicians
21st-century American women politicians
Democratic Party Arizona state senators
Brown University alumni
Candidates in the 2022 United States House of Representatives elections
Lawyers from Tucson, Arizona
Living people
Democratic Party members of the Arizona House of Representatives
Northwestern University Pritzker School of Law alumni
Politicians from Tucson, Arizona
Year of birth missing (living people)